Lt. Col. George Douglas Gray  (1872 – 12 September 1946) was a Scottish physician who served in the British Army in Africa and then as the medical officer to the British ambassador in Peking (now Beijing), China, where he was also the medical superintendent to the British Charitable Hospital there. He assisted in combatting the plague epidemic of 1910–1911 for which he received the thanks of the Chinese government. He was subsequently the British delegate to the International Plague Conference held in Mukden in 1911.

During the First World War, he served in the Royal Army Medical Corps as commanding officer of the hospitals for the Chinese Labour Corps at Noyelles-sur-Mer. In retirement, he wrote a book extolling the benefits of the soya bean which was influenced by his experiences in China.

Early life and family
George Gray was born in Edinburgh, Scotland, in 1872, the son of Robert Collie Gray, JP. He received his MB and CM from the University of Edinburgh in 1894 and his MD in 1897 for a thesis titled "Symptomatic and Idiopathic Insomnia: Its etiology and treatment".

He married Lucy Agnes RRC in 1900 and they had one son, Charles Gray, born 1909, who went on to have a distinguished career in the Indian Army.

Career

Gray served in the British Army in the British Central Africa Protectorate from 1894 to 1898. He then served in British East Africa in 1899 and in Ashanti in 1900. He received a medal and clasp for each. He was the principal medical officer for the British Central Africa Administration from 1897 to 1902.

He was medical officer to the British ambassador in Peking from 1902 to 1926 and was also the medical superintendent to the British Charitable Hospital there (established 1901). He received the thanks of the Chinese government for his work during the plague epidemic of 1910–11, and was the British delegate to the International Plague Conference held in Mukden in 1911.

He served in the Royal Army Medical Corps during the First World War as commanding officer of the hospitals for the Chinese Labour Corps, located principally at Noyelles-sur-Mer, first as Major, and then as acting Lieutenant Colonel. He replaced Major Stafford Mouritz Cox. Under Gray's command, the hospital expanded from 300 to 1,040 beds within six months. It had a specialism in ophthalmology as the Chinese often suffered from diseases of the eye. Gray was described as sympathetic to the labourers and often cared for them after they had been mistreated by their superiors. He realised they were homesick and suggested that a small Chinese pagoda be built near the entrance to the hospital which was done and painted in bright colours. The camp and its hospital were demolished in 1919 and no remains of the site now exist.

In 1920, Gray was awarded the Order of Wen-Hu, 4th Class, by the president of the Republic of China. In 1922, he was the British delegate to the International Finance Commission for Administration of Maritime Customs Surtax for Famine Relief.

Later life
In 1925, Gray was appointed a Commander of The Most Excellent Order of the British Empire (CBE).

In retirement, he set out to write The Romance of the Soya Bean, but finding little romance in its story, changed the title to All about the Soya Bean, which was published in London in 1936. In the book, Gray extolled the benefits of soy products based on his experience in China and medical knowledge, and called for more research on the subject in Britain and the establishment of a body to promote the use of soy products.

Death and legacy
Gray died on 12 September 1946. In 2022, a collection of 22 Chinese Shang dynasty oracle bones were offered for sale by a descendant of Gray. Antiques Trade Gazette speculated that George Gray may have obtained them from the archaeologist James Mellon Menzies, who had worked in China at the same time as Gray, and was later an officer with the Chinese Labour Corps in France.

Publications
 All about the Soya Bean: In agriculture, industry and commerce. John Bale, Sons, and Danielsson, London, 1936.

References

External links 
Douglas Gray – Details of Service and Civilian Career. (son)

1872 births
1946 deaths
Royal Army Medical Corps officers
Alumni of the University of Edinburgh
20th-century Scottish medical doctors
Medical doctors from Edinburgh
Commanders of the Order of the British Empire